Sean Dubh Mac Coisdealbhaigh, Lord of Sliabh Lugha and Chief of the Name, died 1487.

Under the year 1487, the Annals of Lough Cé state that "Mac Goisdelbh, i.e. John, died." 

The Annals of the Four Masters however give a more detailed account, stating that "John Duv Mac Costello, Lord of Sliabh-Lugha, died; and two lords were set up in his place, namely, William, the son of Edmond of the Plain, his own brother, and Jordan, the son of Philip Mac Costello."

External links
 http://www.ucc.ie/celt/published/T100005D/

Irish lords
15th-century Irish people
People from County Mayo
1487 deaths
Medieval Gaels from Ireland
Year of birth unknown